Pierrefonds—Dollard is a federal electoral district in Quebec, Canada, that has been represented in the House of Commons of Canada since 1988. Its population was 108,587 at the 2016 Canadian Census.

This riding occupies the northwest part of the Island of Montreal on Lac des Deux-Montagnes and Rivière des Prairies. It contains the cities of Dollard-des-Ormeaux, Pierrefonds, Roxboro and L'Île-Bizard. This riding is home to a number of pharmaceutical companies. Manufacturing is the main industry, followed by retail trade. Over 17% of the population has a university degree, while just over 4% has less than a Grade 9 education. The average family income is $75,497 with an unemployment rate of 6.5%.

According to the 2001 Canada Census, 37% of the population lists English as their mother tongue, while French is the first language for 32%. There are also significant populations who speak Arabic, Italian, Spanish and Chinese. This is an ethnically mixed riding, including Italian, East Indian and Chinese communities. The total immigrant population is almost 30%.

Geography
The district includes the Montreal borough of Pierrefonds-Roxboro, L'Île-Bizard–Sainte-Geneviève and the city of Dollard-des-Ormeaux.

The neighbouring ridings are Dorval—Lachine—LaSalle, Lac-Saint-Louis, Rivière-des-Mille-Îles, Laval—Les Îles and Saint-Laurent—Cartierville.

History
This riding was established in 1986 by combining parts of Dollard and Vaudreuil ridings. The 1996 redistribution moved nine per cent of the population of the riding into Lac-St-Louis.

In the redistribution of 2004, 91% of the riding was retained.

There were no changes to this riding during the 2012 electoral redistribution.

Members of Parliament

This riding has elected the following Members of Parliament:

Election results

					
Note: Conservative vote is compared to the total of the Canadian Alliance vote and Progressive Conservative vote in 2000 election.
							

Note: Canadian Alliance vote is compared to the Reform vote in 1997 election.

See also
 List of Canadian federal electoral districts
 Past Canadian electoral districts

References

Riding history from the Library of Parliament
2011 Results from Elections Canada
Campaign expense data from Elections Canada

Notes

Federal electoral districts of Montreal
Dollard-des-Ormeaux
Pierrefonds-Roxboro
L'Île-Bizard–Sainte-Geneviève